Visionary Park is a public park in Troutdale, Oregon, United States. The park features Rip Caswell's 2016 sculpture Devoted Passion, which commemorates Sam Hill and Sam Lancaster.

References

External links

 
 Troutdale Visionary Park, Bremik Construction

Parks in Multnomah County, Oregon
Troutdale, Oregon